HMS Diana was one of the  of destroyers planned during the Second World War by the Royal Navy.  The design reflected developments of the Pacific campaign, including long range and the ability to efficiently Replenish At Sea (RAS).

Statistics

Size
Dianas standard displacement was 3,610 tons. The normal peacetime complement of Diana was 297 officers and men.

Launch
The ship was built at Clydebank, Glasgow, by Yarrow and Co. Ltd. (Yard No 1846 ), laid down 3 April 1947 and launched Thursday 8 May 1952 by Lady McGrigor, wife of Admiral of the Fleet Sir Rhoderick McGrigor, and first commissioned 29 March 1954.  Originally the name was to be Druid but this changed to Diana during construction.

At the time Diana was considered a large destroyer, being nearly as big as a pre-war light cruiser.  The Daring class was a logical outcome of the Pacific War, where the ability to stay at sea for long periods was of prime importance.

Armament
The main armament consisted of six  dual purpose guns in three totally enclosed turrets, two forward, one aft.  At the time of building the control system for the guns was the most advanced in the Royal Navy, being completely radar controlled. The guns were considered, at the time, highly accurate with a high rate of fire.

In summary her armament was: (1960)
Six 4.5 inch guns
Two 40 mm Bofors Guns
Five torpedo tubes
One triple Squid anti-submarine mortar

Electrical supply
The ship's electrical power was produced by two turbine generators and three diesel generators. The current used was 440 volts, 60 cycle alternating current (AC) power.

Of the eight Darings, four ships were designed to operate on direct current (DC) for their electrical supply and four to operate on AC. The object was a practical test to determine which form of electrical supply was the most practical. Diana was an AC ship, as were all Royal Navy ships following this 'test'.

Propulsion
Engines by Parsons
Propulsion: geared turbine, 2 shaft

Name, goddess and crest
"This Diana of ours is a very demanding person, goddesses tend to be that way" Captain G. J. Kirkby, DSC **, Royal Navy, Captain, HMS Diana 1961.  The ship's Commission book of 1961 describes Diana (the goddess) as having a distinctly complex personality. Apart from being the huntress, by the light of the sun she was pure and chaste; by the light of the moon, however, she became abandoned and dark. See Diana (goddess).

Career

South Pacific atomic tests controversy

In 1956 Diana was ordered into the radioactive fallout zone of two nuclear weapon tests codenamed Mosaic 1 and Mosaic 2 near the Monte Bello Islands in the Indian Ocean.  The aim of the order, given by British defence officials, was to discover the effects of atomic fallout, both on the ship itself and upon its 308-strong crew.  Since the exposure, around two-thirds of the crew have died, and survivors attest that a variety of fallout-related diseases are responsible. The ship's then-captain, John Gower, who died in 2007 aged 95, wrote after sailing through the fallout zone that he much disliked having to 'continue to serve in a ship, parts of which had been unacceptably radioactive'.  As of January 2008, the British Ministry of Defence has refused to pay compensation to the remaining crew of Diana, citing a legal technicality that all such claims must be lodged within three years of the diagnosis to which they refer.  According to newspaper reports, the decision may see the collapse of the claimants' case, or at the least delay the compensation until 2012, at which time more of the ship's crew may have died. This incident is referred to in the SAS drama Ultimate Force by Ross Kemp's character, SSGt Garvie, who claims his father was a crew member at that time.

On 26 January 1968, Diana was on passage from Gibraltar to Malta when she was ordered to divert to the search for the Israeli submarine Dakar, which had gone missing on her delivery trip from Britain to Israel. After calling at Malta to pick up a medical officer and diving experts, Diana was on course to the search zone when she picked up a distress signal from the Spanish tanker MV Bahia Blanca, which was on fire. After helping Bahia Blancas crew to extinguish the fire, Diana continued to the search area,  taking part in the search operations until 31 January.

Sale to the Peruvian Navy

HMS Diana was acquired by the Peruvian Navy in 1969 together with sister ship . Renamed , the ship was refitted at Cammell Laird, Birkenhead. The refit comprised enclosing the foremast and installing a Plessey AWS-1 radar. The destroyer's armament was further increased with the addition of eight Exocet surface-to-surface missiles in two quadruple mountings.

Palacios was commissioned in April 1973. In 1975, a helicopter landing area was installed which was expanded with the addition of a hangar in 1977-78. This necessitated the removal of the aft 4.5 in gun. The gun was later re-installed and the hangar removed. The refit in 1977-78 also saw the streamlining of the funnel which was also raised, the installation of a Selenia NA-10 director aft for the upgraded twin Breda Bardo 40mm gun mounts and the removal of the Squid mortar and sonar. Palacios served until 1993 when she was stricken.

References

Bibliography
 HMS Diana, the Fifth Commission of the tenth HMS Diana, 1961-1963, on the occasion of her tenth anniversary, written by members of the Ship's Company and produced with the kind permission of the Commanding Officer.

External links
Clyde Built Ships

 

Daring-class destroyers (1949) of the Royal Navy
Ships built on the River Clyde
1952 ships
Cold War destroyers of the United Kingdom
Daring-class destroyers (1949) of the Peruvian Navy